"The Arms of Orion" is a 1989 song by American musician Prince and Scottish singer and actress Sheena Easton. It was the third single to be taken from Prince's 1989 Batman soundtrack album.  It was a #36 pop hit for them on the Billboard Hot 100 charts in 1989.

Background
The song is a slow, romantic ballad that is accompanied mainly by the piano. Synthesizers also play a strong role throughout the song, programmed to emulate a string section. The track also uses a subdued drum machine loop, and samples of rain and thunder. The lyrics allude to the constellation of Orion. Prince had to surrender all publishing rights to the songs on the Batman album including "The Arms of Orion" to Warner Bros. as part of the deal to compose, perform, and produce the soundtrack.

Critical reception
David Giles from Music Week wrote, "Decidedly MOR ballad from the Batman LP which finds Prince duetting with Sheena Easton, the pair of them not sounding unlike Lionel Richie and Whitney Houston. Commercially viable, but once again "his highness" will get away with producing sub-standard floss."

Track listings
 7-inch single
 "The Arms of Orion" (edit) – 3:52
 "I Love U in Me" – 4:12

 12-inch single
 "The Arms of Orion" – 5:03
 "I Love U in Me" – 4:12
 "The Arms of Orion" (edit) – 3:52

Charts

References

1980s ballads
Prince (musician) songs
Sheena Easton songs
Songs written by Prince (musician)
Song recordings produced by Prince (musician)
Pop ballads
1989 songs
1989 singles
Batman (1989 film series)
Batman music
Male–female vocal duets
Warner Records singles